Zavet Municipality is a municipality (obshtina) in Razgrad Province, Northeastern Bulgaria, located in the Ludogorie geographical region part of the Danubian Plain. It is named after its administrative centre - the town of Zavet.

Settlements 

Zavet Municipality includes the following 7 places (towns are shown in bold):

Demography 
The following table shows the change of the population during the last four decades.

Religion 
According to the latest Bulgarian census of 2011, the religious composition, among those who answered the optional question on religious identification, was the following:

See also
Provinces of Bulgaria
Municipalities of Bulgaria
List of cities and towns in Bulgaria

References

External links
 Official website 

Municipalities in Razgrad Province